Pavin is a French cheese made in the Auvergne region of central France. The cheese got its name because of a nearby meromictic crater lake called Lac Pavin. It is in the same cheese family as Saint-Nectaire which originates from the same geographic region.

References

External links

Occitan cheeses
Cuisine of Auvergne-Rhône-Alpes
Cow's-milk cheeses